Food riots may occur when there is a shortage and/or unequal distribution of food. Causes can be food price rises, harvest failures, incompetent food storage, transport problems, food speculation, hoarding, poisoning of food, or attacks by pests. Hence, the pathway between food related issues such as crop failure, price hike or volatility and an actual “riot” is often complex.

Some argue that volatile and high food price are just part of a “perfect storm” combining with climate change, population growth, resource scarcity, and urbanization leading to social unrest. When the public becomes too desperate in such conditions, they may attack shops, farms, homes, or government buildings to attain bread or other staple foods such as grain or salt, as in the 1977 Egyptian bread riots. Often, it is more than an issue of hunger and the need to obtain bread for immediate caloric satisfaction; food riots are part of a larger social movement, such as the Russian revolution or the French revolution. Thus in places with low political freedom there is an increased likelihood for social unrest when food prices are volatile or suddenly rise. Historically, women have been heavily involved in leading food riots; food riots have thus served as a form of female political action even in societies without women's suffrage or other guaranteed political rights.

Twenty-first century
During 2007–2008, a rise in global food prices led to riots in various countries. A similar crisis recurred in 2010–2011.

Due to a wheat crop failure in the mid-western United States because of drought in 2012, as well as simultaneous dryness during the start of the Russia's wheat season, a deficient monsoon rainfall in India and a drought in Africa's Sahel region, predictions were made for a possible outbreak of protests and riots akin to previous years. Yaneer Bar-Yam, the president of the New England Complex Systems Institute, said that computer modelling suggested an outbreak of instability, while he also blamed the use of corn for ethanol as exacerbating the problem. However, the director of trade and markets and the Food and Agriculture Organization, David Hallam, said that there was no imminent danger of such an outcome, though a worsening change in climate and government policies, such as export bans and panicked-buying, could trigger such a scenario. Oxfam added that a one percent increase in the price of food could lead to 16 million more falling below the poverty line. The International Food Policy Research Institute's Director-General Shenggen Fan suggested a global crisis could "hit us very soon. [Using corn for ethanol] actually pushed global food prices higher and many poor people, particularly women and children, have suffered."

Reports of events leading to the 2007–08 world food price crisis and the 2007–08 world food price crisis illustrate that it is challenging to find a single causal factor for food riots and highlights the need to multiple pre-emptive strategies to be adopted in different context given that food prices are said to remain volatile in the coming years. International commentators focusing on Africa have associated the riots with poverty and hunger hence the call to explore strategies to boost productivity and lower food prices. Yet on-the-ground reports highlight that the riots were driven by multiple factors coming together such as popular dissatisfaction with socioeconomic and political situation of the country and the availability of social media that helped rioters to mobilize. In this case some have called for broader structural changes to improve employment, equality and address social injustices.

In Venezuela, the steep fall in oil prices hit the economy hard in the 2010s. With a high rate of inflation (set to top 1,600% in 2017), the destruction of Venezuela´s industrial base has led to a famine in many parts of the country.

Protests in South Africa in July 2021 that initially began as a response to the arrest of former president Jacob Zuma quickly escalated into nationwide riots and looting of supermarkets and shopping malls. The expanded scope of the unrest, that had followed a record economic downturn and increasing unemployment from the COVID-19 pandemic, has been described as food riots.

See also
 Food riots in the Middle East
 List of food riots
 Meat riots
 Southern Bread Riots

References

Further reading